The Tijuana River Valley is a rural community in the southern section of San Diego, California. It neighbors Imperial Beach to the north and west, Egger Highlands and Nestor to the north, San Ysidro to the east, and the U.S.-Mexico border to the south. Major thoroughfares include Hollister Street, Monument Road, and Dairy Mart Road.

History
The valley was home to the Kumeyaay peoples, who established the village of Melijo near Smuggler's Gulch.

The area became part of Rancho Melijo as part of a Mexican land grant to Santiago E. Argüello.

The Tijuana River Valley, along with other portions of South San Diego, was annexed from San Diego County in 1957.

Facilities and landmarks
The community contains 71.5 miles of dirt roads and paths. A number of horse stables are located in the valley. The valley is home to the Tijuana River Valley Regional Park, and is near Border Field State Park and the Tijuana River National Estuarine Research Reserve, both located in Imperial Beach.

Flooding 
The Tijuana River Valley community is at risk of flooding from the Tijuana River. The Tijuana River is considerably polluted with trash, sewage, and other pollutants that threaten the valley community, and the community's environmental resources whenever it floods. Flooding is contained for the most part during dry periods. Yet when it rains the risk of floods and the associated pollution are a significant problem for the Tijuana River Valley. In addition to damage to the Valley's environmental and recreational resources, the pollution present in the floodwaters can spread diseases. Area beaches had almost 1,600 closed days because of this pollution between 2007 and 2017, far more than beaches North of the Valley.

References

Neighborhoods in San Diego
Valleys of San Diego County, California
South Bay (San Diego County)